Oke Mata is a 2000 Indian Telugu-language film,  directed by Muthyala Subbaiah and produced by Ambhika Krishna. The film stars Upendra, Ramya Krishna, Raasi, Nagendra Babu, and Babu Mohan.

Plot
Sooryam, the president of a fisherman's community, protests against the discharge of toxic wastes into the sea by an industrialist's factory. As the protest turns violent, Sooryam gets arrested and jailed. Later, during the trial, the truth about Sooryam's dark past comes out.

Cast
Upendra as Sooryam
Ramya Krishna as Sirisha 
 Raasi
Nagendra Babu as Gangaraju
Babu Mohan
M. S. Narayana
Achyuth

Soundtrack
The music was composed by Koti.

References

External link
 

2000 films
2000s Telugu-language films
Films scored by Koti
Films directed by Muthyala Subbaiah